In the Church of Jesus Christ of Latter-day Saints (LDS Church), there is a general prohibition, deriving from the Word of Wisdom, against intoxicating substances; cannabis was explicitly banned by the church in 1915. The church has also sought to influence "appropriate" legal resolutions on medical cannabis.

Early prohibitions
In August 1915, the LDS Church banned the use of cannabis by its members, and two months later the state of Utah banned cannabis. Some scholars have linked the two events, arguing that cannabis usage by Mormon returnees who had earlier fled to Mexico led the church, and later the state, to make their decisions. Others contradict this, noting that Utah's prohibition laws were part of a larger package of anti-drug laws which happened to include cannabis, but did not indicate a statewide concern.

1971 decriminalization
The decriminalization effort in 1971 was said to be strong in Utah due to the state's high rate of use of cannabis, and the preference of Latter-day Saints to handle matters within the church and family.

Response to modern cannabis movement
As medical and recreational cannabis decriminalization movements began in the late twentieth and early twenty-first century in the United States, the LDS Church has been asked for its position on the issue.

In a 2010 conference for local church leaders in Colorado, general authorities of the church, including now current church president Russell M. Nelson, explained in answer to a question that the church has no position on medical marijuana and that the issue was left to individual consultation with scriptures and a member's bishop. This same stance was later reiterated in a private discussion among the Quorum of the Twelve Apostles in a 2010 video that was made public in 2016. The discussion included consensus that the church opposed recreational marijuana use more broadly but had no position on medical use specifically.

In February 2016, the church released a statement supporting efforts to legalize CBD oil in Utah, but not whole-plant cannabis remedies:

In October 2016, the church's First Presidency sent a letter to congregations in California, Nevada, and Arizona (states which were to vote on legalized recreational cannabis in November), urging members to oppose legalization:

In a 2019 article in the church's youth magazine New Era, the following statement was given regarding cannabis:

See also
 Cannabis and religion
 Religion and drugs

References

Further reading

Latter Day Saint movement and society
Church of Jesus Christ of Latter-Day Saints
Cannabis in Utah
1915 in cannabis